The 1928 Kent State Golden Flashes football team represented Kent State during the 1928 college football season. In its fourth season under head coach Merle E. Wagoner, Kent State compiled a 4–2–2 record and outscored by a total of 89 to 34.

In addition to compiling the program's first winning season, the 1928 team set programs records for points scored in a game (26 against Cedarville) and in a season (89). The team also gained 347 yards against Cedarville, which was 100 more than the team had ever gained in a previous game.

The Chestnut Burr of 1929 noted the remarkable improvement of the 1928 team, building on the prior year's fine defensive work with improved offensive output.

Schedule

Roster
The roster of the 1928 team included:
 Jack Chernin, center
 Sherman Crow, guard
 Frank Curtiss, end
 Archie Davis, end
 Willard Fisher, end
 Claude Graber, guard
 Clarence Hinkle, guard
 "Cocky" Kilbourne, fullback
 Jimmie Menough, halfback
 Ted Sapp, tackle
 "Jake" Searl, captain
 Ralph Spangler, tackle
 Arthur Stejaskal, halfback

References

Kent State
Kent State Golden Flashes football seasons
Kent State Golden Flashes football